Catocala fredi is a moth in the family Erebidae first described by Hans Bytinsky-Salz and Wilhelm Brandt in 1937. It is found in Iran.

References

fredi
Moths described in 1937
Moths of Asia